Christopher Floyd is an English barrister and judge.

Christopher or Chris Floyd may also refer to:

Chris Floyd (born 1975), American football player
 Chris Floyd (photographer), British photographer
Christopher Floyd, character in 2010
Chris Floyd, character in 2061: Odyssey Three